Robert Leroy Mothersbaugh, Jr. (born August 11, 1952), or by his stage name "Bob 1", is an American musician, singer, songwriter, and composer.

Mothersbaugh's music career spans more than 40 years. He came to prominence in the late 1970s as lead guitarist and occasional lead singer of the new wave band Devo, which released a top 20 hit in 1980 with the single "Whip It". The band has maintained a cult following throughout its existence. He is the younger brother of co-founder and lead singer Mark Mothersbaugh.

Early years
Robert Leroy Mothersbaugh, Jr. was born on August 11, 1952, in Akron, Ohio. He is the son of Mary Margaret ("Mig") and Robert Mothersbaugh, Sr. He grew up with one older brother, Mark, and one younger brother, Jim, and two sisters, Amy and Susan. In high school, he played in the cover band Jitters with his brother Jim Mothersbaugh and Greg Brosch on guitar and Greg Kaiser on bass. His father appeared in early Devo films and fan events as the character General Boy, and his brothers participated in the band, although Jim's tenure was brief, appearing only on several early demos.

Career

Devo
In early 1970, Bob Lewis and Gerald Casale formed the idea of the "devolution" of the human race after Casale's friend Jeffrey Miller was killed by Ohio National Guardsmen firing on a student demonstration. Mothersbaugh joined Devo in 1974. After the band underwent a few line-up changes, Bob Mothersbaugh became part of the most popular five-piece incarnation, which included the Casale brothers: Gerald and Bob ("Bob 2") and the Mothersbaugh brothers: Mark and Bob ("Bob 1"), as well as drummer Alan Myers. In 1981, Mothersbaugh with Devo served as Toni Basil's backing band on Word of Mouth, her debut album, which included versions of three Devo songs, recorded with Basil singing lead.

Following the commercial failure of their sixth studio album Shout, Warner Bros. dropped Devo. Shortly after, claiming to feel creatively unfulfilled, Alan Myers left the band, causing the remaining band members to abandon the plans for a Shout video LP, as well as a tour.

In 1987, Devo reformed with new drummer David Kendrick, formerly of Sparks to replace Myers. Their first project was a soundtrack for the flop horror film Slaughterhouse Rock, starring Toni Basil, and they released the albums Total Devo (1988) and Smooth Noodle Maps (1990), on Enigma.

The band stopped performing again in 1991, but reformed as a musical act in 1995.

In 2006, Devo worked on a project with Disney known as Devo 2.0. A band of child performers was assembled and re-recorded Devo songs. A quote from the Akron Beacon Journal stated, "Devo recently finished a new project in cahoots with Disney called Devo 2.0, which features the band playing old songs and two new ones with vocals provided by children. Their debut album, a two disc CD/DVD combo entitled DEV2.0, was released on March 14, 2006. The lyrics of some of the songs were changed for family-friendly airplay, which has been claimed by the band to be a play on irony of the messages of their classic hits. The album, Something for Everybody was eventually released in June 2010, preceded by a 12" single of "Fresh"/"What We Do".

Mothersbaugh and the other Devo members were part of the Church of the SubGenius.

Other work
In 1989, Bob Mothersbaugh and other members of Devo were involved in the project Visiting Kids, releasing a self-titled EP on the New Rose label in 1990. The group featured Mark Mothersbaugh's then-wife Nancye Ferguson, as well as David Kendrick, Bob Mothersbaugh and Bob's daughter Alex Mothersbaugh. Their record was produced by Bob Casale and Mark Mothersbaugh, and Mark also co-wrote some of the songs. Visiting Kids appeared on the soundtrack to the film Rockula, as well as on the Late Show with David Letterman. A promotional video was filmed for the song "Trilobites".

Following Devo's hiatus in 1991, Mothersbaugh founded his own band called The Bob I Band and recorded an unreleased album with the drummer, David Kendrick. The master tapes were lost, though a bootleg of the band is circulating.

Mothersbaugh produces soundtracks for film and television, such as the animated television series Rugrats as part of the production company Mutato Muzika.

In 2015, Mothersbaugh performed the theme to Harvey Beaks.

Equipment

Current
Gibson Custom Michael Bloomfield 1959 Les Paul
Chopper Guitars "Spudocaster"
Gibson L6-S Natural Maple
LaBaye 2x4
Fractal Audio Axe-FX Ultra
Ibanez TS9 Tubescreamer

Former
G&L SC2 Student Model
Ibanez custom blue "Spud" guitar
Ibanez Les Paul (modified w/ inverted horn)
Ibanez Iceman
Line 6 POD XT and X3s

Soundtracks

Television

Film

References

External links
Mutato Muzika official site

1952 births
Living people
20th-century American singers
21st-century American singers
20th-century American guitarists
21st-century American guitarists
American male composers
American rock guitarists
American male guitarists
American male singers
American new wave musicians
American SubGenii
American people of English descent
American people of Swiss descent
Devo members
Songwriters from Ohio
Musicians from Akron, Ohio
Lead guitarists
Male new wave singers
Guitarists from Ohio
20th-century American composers
American post-punk musicians
Punk Rock Karaoke members